The Buffalo Bandits are a lacrosse team based in Buffalo, New York playing in the National Lacrosse League (NLL). The 2013 season was their twenty-second season in the NLL.

The Bandits started the season with a fairly strong 5–3 record, with wins over their division rivals the Toronto Rock and Philadelphia Wings and two wins over the defending champion Rochester Knighthawks. But for the second straight season, the Bandits lost six in a row to put their playoff hopes in jeopardy. They finished the season 6-10 and out of the playoffs for the first time since 2002.

After the season, long-time coach Darris Kilgour was fired by the Bandits.

Standings

Game log
Reference:

Roster

Transactions

Trades

Entry Draft
The 2012 NLL Entry Draft took place on October 1, 2012. The Bandits made the following selections:

See also
2013 NLL season

References

Buffalo
Buffalo Bandits seasons
Buffalo Bandits